The 2008 UCI Track Cycling World Championships – Men's 1 km Time Trial was the 2008 world championship track cycling time trial. It was held on 30 March 2008 in Manchester, United Kingdom. The event was conducted over a single round.

World record

Results

References

Men's 1 km time trial
UCI Track Cycling World Championships – Men's 1 km time trial